The 2012 Goody's Fast Relief 500 was a NASCAR Sprint Cup Series stock car race held on April 1, 2012 at Martinsville Speedway in Ridgeway, Virginia. Contested over 500 laps, it was the sixth race of the 2012 season. Ryan Newman of Stewart-Haas Racing took his first win of the season, A. J. Allmendinger finished second and Dale Earnhardt Jr. finished third.

Report

Background

Martinsville Speedway is one of five short tracks to hold NASCAR races. The track's turns are banked at eleven degrees, while the front stretch, the location of the finish line, is banked at zero degrees. The back stretch also has a zero degree banking. The racetrack has seats for 63,000 spectators.

Before the race, Greg Biffle led the Drivers' Championship with 195 points, and Kevin Harvick stood in second with 188. Dale Earnhardt Jr. followed in third with 178 points, one ahead of Tony Stewart and three ahead of Martin Truex Jr. in fourth and fifth. Matt Kenseth, with 173, was two points ahead of Denny Hamlin in seventh. Clint Bowyer, with 157 points, was one point ahead of Jimmie Johnson and two ahead of Ryan Newman in ninth and tenth. In the Manufacturers' Championship, Chevrolet was leading with 33 points, four points ahead of Ford. Toyota, with 27 points, was six points ahead of Dodge in the battle for third. Harvick is the race's defending race winner after winning it in 2011.

Practice and qualifying

Two practice sessions were held before the race on Friday, both lasting 90 minutes each. Jeff Gordon was quickest with a time of 19.512 seconds in the first session, less than two-hundredths of a second faster than Kyle Busch. Hamlin was just off Burton's pace, followed by Dale Earnhardt Jr., Newman, and Martin Truex Jr. Stewart was seventh, still within two-tenths of a second of Gordon's time. In the second and final practice session, Gordon was quickest with a time of 19.516 seconds. Kurt Busch followed in the second position, ahead of Brad Keselowski, Newman, and David Stremme. Landon Cassill was sixth after posting a time of 19.844 seconds, while Josh Wise and Juan Pablo Montoya followed in seventh and eighth. Scott Riggs and Aric Almirola rounded out the first ten positions.

Forty-six cars are entered for qualifying, but only forty-three raced because of NASCAR's qualifying procedure.

Results

Qualifying

 Yeley was awarded the start after Raines failed post-qualifying inspection.

Race results

Standings after the race

Drivers' Championship standings

Manufacturers' Championship standings

Note: Only the top five positions are included for the driver standings.

References

NASCAR races at Martinsville Speedway
Goody's Fast Relief 500
Goody's Fast Relief 500
Goody's Fast Relief 500